Carry On Matron is a 1972 British comedy film, the 23rd release in the series of 31 Carry On films (1958–1992). It was released in May 1972. It features series regulars Sid James, Kenneth Williams, Charles Hawtrey, Joan Sims, Hattie Jacques, Bernard Bresslaw, Barbara Windsor and Kenneth Connor. This was the last Carry on... film for Terry Scott after appearing in seven films.  Carry On Matron was the second and last Carry On... for Kenneth Cope.

Along with the next film in the series (Carry On Abroad), it features the highest number of the regular Carry On team. The only regular members missing are Jim Dale and Peter Butterworth. Dale would return belatedly for Carry On Columbus in 1992 and Butterworth returned in a major role in Abroad the following year. Butterworth was due to play Freddy but was unable because of other work engagements.

Plot
Sid Carter (Sid James) is the cunning head of a criminal gang that includes the longhaired drip Ernie Bragg (Bernard Bresslaw), the cheeky Freddy (Bill Maynard) and Sid's honest son, Cyril (Kenneth Cope). Cyril does not want a life of crime, but is emotionally blackmailed by his father into going along with his scheme to rob Finisham Maternity Hospital for its stock of contraceptive pills and sell them abroad. Cyril reluctantly disguises himself as a new female nurse to case the hospital. Assumed to be one of the new student nurses who have just arrived, he is assigned to share a room with the shapely blonde nurse, Susan Ball (Barbara Windsor). Unfortunately for Cyril, he also catches the eye of the hospital lothario, Dr Prodd (Terry Scott).

Sir Bernard Cutting (Kenneth Williams), the hypochondriac registrar of the hospital, is convinced he's undergoing a sex change. When he consults the nutty Dr F. A. Goode (Charles Hawtrey), Goode dishes out psychiatric mumbo jumbo, stating that Cutting merely wants to prove his manhood, and Cutting decides he is in love with Matron (Hattie Jacques). Matron, on the other hand, has more than enough to contend with on the wards, with the gluttonous patient Mrs Tidey (Joan Sims) who seems more interested in eating than producing a baby, and her long-suffering British Rail worker husband (Kenneth Connor) who continually hangs around the waiting room.

When Cyril goes back to Prodd's room to get a map of the hospital, Prodd attempts to get intimate, only to be knocked across the room. Prodd and Cyril are called out on an emergency when lovely film star Jane Darling (Valerie Leon) goes into labour, but as Cyril knocks Prodd out in the ambulance, he is forced to deal with the actress's triplets being born. Jane Darling is delighted with Cyril and hails "the nurse" a heroine for her efforts, bringing fame to the hospital. Susan uncovers Cyril's disguise, but as she is in love with him, does not reveal the truth.

The much put-upon Sister (Jacki Piper) desperately tries to keep the ward in order, while Cutting's secretary, Miss Banks (Patsy Rowlands) keeps her employer in check, but nothing can cool his pent-up desire to prove himself as a man, and it's Matron who's in his sights. The criminal gang don disguises—Sid dresses as the foreign "Dr Zhivago" and Ernie as a heavily expectant mum—but the crime is thwarted by the mothers-to-be. The medical hierarchy's threat to call the police is halted when Sid reveals the heroine of the day is a man, and the hospital realise they would suffer nationwide humiliation if anyone found out. Cyril weds his shapely nurse Susan, and Matron finally gets her doctor.

Cast

Sid James as Sid Carter
Kenneth Williams as Sir Bernard Cutting
Charles Hawtrey as Doctor Francis A Goode
Hattie Jacques as Matron
Joan Sims as Mrs Tidey
Bernard Bresslaw as Ernie Bragg
Barbara Windsor as Nurse Susan Ball
Kenneth Connor as Mr Tidey
Terry Scott as Doctor Prodd
Kenneth Cope as Cyril Carter
Jacki Piper as Sister
Bill Maynard as Freddy
Patsy Rowlands as Evelyn Banks
Derek Francis as Arthur
Amelia Bayntun as Mrs Jenkins
Valerie Leon as Jane Darling
Brian Osborne as Ambulance driver
Gwendolyn Watts as Frances Kemp
Valerie Shute as Miss Smethurst
Margaret Nolan as Mrs Tucker
Michael Nightingale as Doctor Pearson
Wendy Richard as Miss Willing
Zena Clifton as Au pair girl
Bill Kenwright as Reporter
Robin Hunter as Mr Darling
Jack Douglas as Twitching father
Madeline Smith as Mrs Pullitt
Juliet Harmer as Mrs Bentley (uncredited)
Gilly Grant as Nurse in bath (uncredited)
Lindsay March as Shapely nurse (uncredited)
Laura Collins as Nurse (uncredited)

Crew
Screenplay – Talbot Rothwell
Music – Eric Rogers
Production Manager – Jack Swinburne
Art Director – Lionel Couch
Editor – Alfred Roome
Director of Photography – Ernest Steward
Camera Operator – James Bawden
Continuity – Joy Mercer
Assistant Director – Bert Batt
Sound Recordists – Danny Daniel & Ken Barker
Make-up – Geoffrey Rodway
Hairdresser – Stella Rivers
Costume Designer – Courtenay Elliott
Assistant Art Director – William Alexander
Set Dresser – Peter Lamont
Dubbing Editor – Peter Best
Titles – GSE Ltd
Processor – Rank Film Laboratories
Assistant Editor – Jack Gardner
Wardrobe Mistresses – Vi Murray & Maggie Lewin
Producer – Peter Rogers
Director – Gerald Thomas

Filming and locations

Filming dates – 11 October-26 November 1971

Interiors:
 Pinewood Studios, Buckinghamshire

Exteriors:
 Heatherwood Hospital, Ascot, Berkshire
 The White House, Denham, Buckinghamshire
 St Mary's Church, Denham, Buckinghamshire

Bibliography

Keeping the British End Up: Four Decades of Saucy Cinema by Simon Sheridan (third edition) (2007) (Reynolds & Hearn Books)

External links 
 
Carry On Matron at The Whippit Inn

1972 films
1970s English-language films
Matron
Films directed by Gerald Thomas
Films set in hospitals
1972 comedy films
Films shot at Pinewood Studios
Films produced by Peter Rogers
Films with screenplays by Talbot Rothwell
1970s British films